Dual electrification is a system whereby a railway line is supplied power both via overhead catenary and a third rail.  This is done to enable trains that use either system of power to share the same railway line, for example in the case of mainline and suburban trains (as used at Hamburg S-Bahn between 1940 and 1955).

Examples
 London, UK
North London Line changeover at Acton Central.
Northern City Line changeover at Drayton Park.
Thameslink route changeover at City Thameslink (northbound) and Farringdon (southbound).
West London line changeover between Willesden Junction and Shepherd's Bush.
 New York, NY
 Penn Station
 East River Tunnels
 North River Tunnels
 Athens, GR
 Line 3 of Athens Metro uses third rail for underground part and overhead power supply on surface for access to/from Airport.
Boston, MA
Like Athens, the MBTA Blue Line uses third rail for the underground part, and switches to overhead catenary power at Airport station.

Variations

Both systems live
The system is usually used only in exceptional cases as it can lead to problems caused by the interaction of the electric circuits; for example, where one system is powered with direct current and another by alternating current (AC), premagnetisation of the substation transformers of the AC system can occur.

One system live
A similar arrangement to dual electrification is one in which both means of powering a train are present, but not live simultaneously.  Such arrangements can be found in frontier stations and in sections of railway used for running tests.

See also
 Multi-system (rail)

References

Electric rail transport